The Turk's Head Building is a 16-story office high-rise in Providence, Rhode Island. Completed in 1913, the building is one of the oldest skyscrapers in Providence. When completed in 1913, the Turk's Head Building surpassed the 1901 Union Trust Company Building to become the tallest building in downtown (the Rhode Island State House is taller and was finished in 1904). The building retained that title until 1922, when the Providence Biltmore was completed.

History
The building is designed in a V-shape, and architectural historian William McKenzie Woodward asserts that the architects of the building "clearly had in mind Daniel Burnham's Flatiron Building" (in New York City). The skyscraper's peculiar name dates back to the early nineteenth century, when shopkeeper Jacob Whitman mounted a ship's figurehead above his store. The figurehead, which came from the ship Sultan, depicted the head of an Ottoman warrior. Whitman's store was called "At the sign of the Turk's Head". The figurehead was lost in a storm, and today a stone replica is found on the building's 3rd floor façade.

After buying the building in 1997 for $4.2 million and spending $3 million renovating it, brothers Evan and Lloyd Granoff sold the building in 2008 for $17.55 million to FB Capital Partners. The Granoffs had not been actively trying to sell the building — their attorney advisor said they accepted the deal because the sum offered was well over the worth of the building.

The building was also featured in one of the scenes from the Disney movie Underdog.

Tenants
The building is known for the longevity of its tenants. It is home to at least two tenants which have operated in the building for over a century. The investment firm Brown, Lisle/Cummings Inc., and the law firm Gardner, Sawyer, Gates & Sloan both opened their doors in 1913 and kept offices in the building for a century. Gardner, Sawyer, Gates & Sloan is notable as the firm of Ada Lewis Sawyer, Rhode Island's first female lawyer. Attorney Timothy Conlon has gained nationwide representation for his work as a divorce lawyer and in litigation involving clergy sexual abuse.

Gallery

References

External links 

Skyscraper office buildings in Providence, Rhode Island
1913 establishments in Rhode Island
Office buildings completed in 1913